The 1934 SANFL Grand Final was an Australian rules football competition.  beat  123 to 114.

References 

SANFL Grand Finals
SANFL Grand Final, 1934